"Trust Myself" is the winner's single by season seven winner of The Voice Australia, Sam Perry. It was released digitally immediately after he was announced as the winner on 17 June 2018. Perry co-wrote "Trust Myself", unlike the previous winners of The Voice, who have had a single allocated to them by the label.

Chart performance
"Trust Myself" debuted on the ARIA Singles Chart at number 78 with 2,414 sales.

Charts

References

2018 singles
2018 songs
Universal Records singles